The canton of Beauvais-2 is an administrative division of the Oise department, northern France. It was created at the French canton reorganisation which came into effect in March 2015. Its seat is in Beauvais.

It consists of the following communes:
 
Allonne
Auneuil
Auteuil
Beauvais (partly)
Berneuil-en-Bray
Flavacourt
Frocourt
Goincourt
La Houssoye
Labosse
Lachapelle-aux-Pots
Lalande-en-Son
Lalandelle
Aux Marais
Ons-en-Bray
Porcheux
Rainvillers
Saint-Aubin-en-Bray
Saint-Léger-en-Bray
Saint-Martin-le-Nœud
Saint-Paul
Sérifontaine
Le Vaumain
Le Vauroux
Villers-Saint-Barthélemy
Warluis

References

Cantons of Oise